Hamstring curl may refer to a variety of exercises that target the hamstrings, including:
Nordic hamstring curl
Leg curl